3D XPoint (pronounced three-D cross point) is a discontinued non-volatile memory (NVM) technology developed jointly by Intel and Micron Technology. It was announced in July 2015 and was available on the open market under the brand name Optane (Intel) from April 2017 to July 2022. Bit storage is based on a change of bulk resistance, in conjunction with a stackable cross-grid data access array. Initial prices are less than dynamic random-access memory (DRAM) but more than flash memory.

As a non-volatile memory, 3D XPoint has a number of features that distinguish it from other currently available RAM and NVRAM. Although the first generations of 3D XPoint were not especially large or fast, 3D XPoint was used to create some of the fastest SSDs available as of 2019, with small-write latency. As the memory is inherently fast, and byte-addressable, techniques such as read-modify-write and caching used to enhance traditional SSDs are not needed to obtain high performance. In addition, chipsets such as Cascade Lake are designed with inbuilt support for 3D XPoint, that allow it to be used as a caching or acceleration disk, and it is also fast enough to be used as non-volatile RAM (NVRAM) in a DIMM package.

History

Development
Development of 3D XPoint began around 2012. Intel and Micron had developed other non-volatile phase-change memory (PCM) technologies previously; Mark Durcan of Micron said 3D XPoint architecture differs from previous offerings of PCM, and uses chalcogenide materials for both selector and storage parts of the memory cell that are faster and more stable than traditional PCM materials like GST. But today, it is thought of as a subset of ReRAM.

3D XPoint has been stated to use electrical resistance and to be bit addressable. Similarities to the resistive random-access memory under development by Crossbar Inc. have been noted, but 3D XPoint uses different storage physics. Specifically, transistors are replaced by threshold switches as selectors in the memory  cells. 3D XPoint developers indicate that it is based on changes in resistance of the bulk material. Intel CEO Brian Krzanich responded to ongoing questions on the XPoint material that the switching was based on "bulk material properties". Intel has stated that 3D XPoint does not use a phase-change or memristor technology, although this is disputed by independent reviewers.

3D XPoint has been the most widely produced standalone memory based on other than charge storage, whereas other alternative memories, like ReRAM or MRAM, have so far only been widely developed on embedded platforms.

Initial production
In mid-2015, Intel announced the Optane brand for storage products based on 3D XPoint technology. Micron (using the QuantX brand) estimated the memory to be sold for about half the price of dynamic random-access memory (DRAM), but four to five times the price of flash memory. Initially, a wafer fabrication facility in Lehi, Utah, operated by IM Flash Technologies LLC (an Intel-Micron joint venture) made small quantities of 128 Gbit chips in 2015. They stack two 64 Gbit planes. In early 2016 mass production of the chips was expected in 12 to 18 months.

In early 2016, IM Flash announced that the first generation of solid-state drives would achieve 95000 IOPS throughput with 9 microsecond latency. This low latency significantly increases IOPS at low queue depths for random operations. At Intel Developer Forum 2016, Intel demonstrated PCI Express (PCIe) 140 GB development boards showing 2.4–3× improvement in benchmarks compared to PCIe NAND flash solid-state drives (SSDs). On March 19, 2017, Intel announced their first product: a PCIe card available in the second half of 2017.

Reception

Despite the initial lukewarm reception when first released, 3D XPoint – particularly in the form of Intel's Optane range – has been highly acclaimed and widely recommended for tasks where its specific features are of value, with reviewers such as Storage Review concluding in August 2018 that for low-latency workloads, 3D XPoint was producing 500,000 4K sustained IOPS for both reads and writes, with 3–15 microsecond latencies, and that at present "there is currently nothing [else] that comes close", while Tom's Hardware described the Optane 900p in December 2017 as being like a "mythical creature" that must be seen to be believed, and which doubled the speed of the best previous consumer devices. ServeTheHome concluded in 2017 that in read, write and mixed tests, Optane SSDs were consistently around 2.5× as fast as the best Intel datacentre SSDs which had preceded them, the P3700 NVMe. AnandTech noted that consumer Optane-based SSDs were similar in performance to the best non-3D-XPoint SSDs for large transfers, with both being "blown away" by the large transfer performance of enterprise Optane SSDs.

Sale of Lehi fab, and discontinuation
On March 16, 2021, Micron announced that it would cease development of 3D XPoint in order to develop products based on Compute Express Link (CXL). The Lehi fab was never fully utilized, and was sold to Texas Instruments for USD 900 Mio. Intel responded at the time that its ability to supply Intel Optane products would not be affected.

In 2021, Intel discontinued its consumer line of Optane products, and in July 2022, Intel announced the winding down of the Optane division, effectively discontinuing the development of 3D XPoint.

Compatibility

Intel
Intel distinguishes between "Intel Optane Memory" and "Intel Optane SSDs". As a memory component, Optane requires specific chipset and CPU support. As an ordinary SSD, Optane is broadly compatible with a very wide range of systems, and its main requirements are much like any other SSD – ability to be plugged into the hardware, operating system, BIOS/UEFI and driver support for NVMe, and adequate cooling.

 As a standards-based NVMe-PCIe SSD: Optane devices can be used as the storage element of an ordinary solid-state drive (SSD), typically in M.2 card format, NVMe PCI Express format, or U.2 standalone format. When Optane is used as an ordinary SSD (in any of these formats), its compatibility requirements are the same as for any traditional SSD. Therefore, compatibility depends only upon whether the hardware, operating system and drivers can support NVMe and similar SSDs. Optane SSDs are therefore compatible with a wide range of older and newer chipsets and CPUs (including non-Intel chipsets and CPUs).
 As a memory or on-board acceleration device: Optane devices can also be used as NVDIMM (non volatile main memory) or for certain kinds of caching or accelerating roles, but unlike general SSD roles, this requires newer hardware, since the chipset and motherboard must be designed to work specifically with Optane in those roles.

Micron
Micron offers NVMe AIC SSD drives (QuantX X100) which maintain compatibility with NVMe capable systems. Native support as an acceleration device is not supported (although tiered storage can be used).

See also
 Intel Turbo Memory
 NAND flash memory
 NOR flash memory

Notes

References

External links
 , 44 minutes

Computer memory
Intel products
Non-volatile random-access memory